After the Storm may refer to:

Film 
 After the Storm (1915 film), a short film directed by B. Reeves Eason
 After the Storm (1928 film), a silent drama directed by George B. Seitz
 After the Storm (1948 film), an Austrian drama film directed by Gustav Ucicky
 After the Storm (1955 film), a film directed by  Roberto Gavaldón
 After the Storm (2001 film), a film directed by Guy Ferland, based on a short story by Ernest Hemingway
 After the Storm (2009 film), a documentary with a score by Stephen Flaherty
 After the Storm (2016 film), a Japanese film directed by Hirokazu Koreeda

Literature and photography
 After the Storm, a novel in the Americana Series by Janet Dailey
 "After the Storm", a short story by Ernest Hemingway included in his collection Winner Take Nothing (1933)
 After the Storm, a Kazakh novel by Gabiden Mustafin
 After the Storm: True Stories of Disaster and Recovery at Sea (2002), a book by John Rousmaniere
 After the Storm, a 2001 photographic exhibition and 2007 book by Bob Walker

Music

Albums
 After the Storm (Crosby, Stills & Nash album) or the title song, 1994
 After the Storm (Monica album), 2003
 After the Storm (Norman Brown album) or the title song, 1994
 After the Storm (Shatta Wale album) or the title song, "Afta Di Storm", 2016
 After the Storm, by Atrocity, 2010
 After the Storm, an EP by Alex Band, 2012
 After the Storm, an EP by the Idoru, 2003

Songs
 "After the Storm" (Ai song), 2013
"After the Storm" (Kali Uchis song), 2018
 "After the Storm" (Wynn Stewart song), 1976
 "After the Storm", by the Cynic Project, 2000
 "After the Storm", by Mumford & Sons from Sigh No More, 2009
 "After the Storm", by Oh Land from Family Tree, 2019